Stegosauridae is a family of thyreophoran dinosaurs (armoured dinosaurs) within the suborder Stegosauria. The clade is defined as all species of dinosaurs more closely related to Stegosaurus than Huayangosaurus. The name ‘Stegosauridae’ is thus a stem-based name taken from the well-represented genus – Stegosaurus (meaning ‘roofed lizard’). Fossil evidence of stegosaurids, dating from the Middle Jurassic through the Early Cretaceous, have been recovered from North America, Eurasia and Africa.

The clade Stegosauridae is composed of the genera Stegosaurus, Dacentrurus, Miragaia, Loricatosaurus, and Kentrosaurus, with the last considered to be at the base of the clade. The stegosaurids like all other stegosaurians were quadrupedal herbivores that exhibited the characteristic stegosaurian dorsal dermal plates. These large, thin, erect plates are thought to be aligned parasagittally from the neck to near the end of the tail. The end of the tail has pairs of spikes, sometimes referred to as a thagomizer. Although defense, thermo-regulation and display have been theorized to be the possible functions of these dorsal plates, a study of the ontogenetic histology of the plates and spikes suggests that the plates serve different functions at different stages of the stegosaurids’ life histories. The terminal spikes in the tail are thought to have been used in old adults, at least, as a weapon for defence. However, the function of stegosaurid plates and spikes, at different life stages, still remains a matter of great debate.

Stegosaurids are distinguished from other stegosaurians in that the former have lost the plesiomorphic pre-maxillary teeth and lateral scute rows along the trunk. Furthermore, stegosaurids as have long narrow skulls and longer hindlimbs compared to their forelimbs. However, these two features are not diagnostic of Stegosauridae because they may also be present in non-stegosaurid stegosaurians.

Description
The cranial remains of stegosaurids, like all stegosaurians, are rarely discovered. Hence, a significant portion of the knowledge of their skull morphology comes from few complete skulls discovered of Stegosaurus and fragmentary remains of other stegosaurids. In general, stegosaurids have proportionally long, low and narrow snouts with a deep mandible, compared to that of Huayangosaurus. Stegosaurids also lack premaxillary teeth.

Among stegosaurids, only Kentrosaurus has been found with parascapular spines, which project posteriorly out of the lower part of the shoulder plates. These spines are long, rounded and comma-shaped in lateral view and have an enlarged base. Loricatosaurus was also believed to have a parascapular spine, but Maidment et al. (2008) observed that the discovered specimen, from which the spine is described, has a completely different morphology than the parascapular spine specimens of other stegosaurs. They suggest it may be a fragmentary tail spine instead. The genuine absence of parascapular spines in other stegosaurids is considered a secondary loss since many basal stegosaurs like Gigantspinosaurus and Huayangosaurus have been discovered with them.

Stegosaurids also lack lateral scute rows that run longitudinally on either side of the trunk in Huayangosaurus and ankylosaurs, indicating yet another secondary loss of a plesiomorphic characters. However, the absence of lateral scutes as well as pre-maxillary teeth mentioned above are not specifically diagnostic of stegosaurids, since these features are also present in some other stegosaurians, whose phylogenetic relationships are unclear.

Plates and spikes 
Stegosaurids exhibit the characteristic dorsal osteoderms, found in all stegosaurs, in the form of erect plates and spines. Stegosaurid plates have a thick base and central portion, but are transversely thin elsewhere. The plates become remarkably large and thin in Stegosaurus. They are found in varying sizes along the dorsum, with the central region of the back usually having the largest and tallest plates. The arrangement of these parasagittal dorsal plates has been intensely debated in the past. Discoverer Othniel Charles Marsh suggested a single median row of plates running post-cranially along the longitudinal axis and Lull argued in favour of bilaterally paired arrangement throughout the series. Current scientific consensus lies in the arrangement proposed by Gilmore - two parasagittal rows of staggered alternates, after the discovery of an almost complete skeleton preserved in this manner in rock. Furthermore, no two plates share the same size and shape, making the possibility of bilaterally paired rows even less likely. Plates are usually found with distinct vascular grooves on their lateral surfaces, suggesting the presence of a circulatory network. Stegosaurids also have osteoderms on the throat in the form of small depressed ossicles and two pairs of elongated spike-like tail-spines.

In an ontogenetic histological analysis of Stegosaurus plates and spikes, Hayashi et al. (2012) examined their structure and function through juveniles to old adults. They found that throughout the ontogeny, the dorsal osteoderms are composed of dense ossified collagen fibres in both the cortical and cancellous sections of the bone, suggesting that plates and spikes are formed from the direct mineralization of already existing fibrous networks in the skin. However, the many structural features, seen in the spikes and plates of old adults specimens, are acquired at different stages of development. Extensive vascular networks form in the plates during the change from juveniles to young adults and persist in old adults but spikes acquire a thick cortex with a large axial vascular channel only in old adults. Hayashi et al. argue that the formation of nourishing vascular networks in young adults supported the growth of large plates. This would have enhanced the size of the animal, which may have helped attract mates and deter rivals. Furthermore, the presence of the vascular networks in the plates of the young adult indicate a secondary use of the plates as a thermoregulatory device for heat loss much like the elephant ear, toucan bill or alligator osteoderms. The thickening of the cortical section of the bone and the compaction of bone in the terminal tail-spikes in old adults suggest that they were used as defence weapons, but not until an ontogenetically late stage. The development of the large axial channel in old adults from small canals in young adults, facilitated the further enlargement of the spikes by increasing the amount of nourishment supplied. On the other hand, plates do not show a similar degree of bone compaction or cortical thickening indicating they would not be capable of taking much weight from above. This suggests they were not as important as spikes in active defense.

The protective nature of dorsal plates has also been questioned in the past Davitashvili (1961) noted that narrow dorsal location of the plates still left the sides vulnerable. Since the pattern of plates and spines vary between species, he suggested it could be important for intraspecific recognition and as a display for sexual selection. This is corroborated by Spassov's (1982) observations that the plates are arranged for maximum visible effect when viewed laterally during non-aggressive agonistic behaviour, as opposed to from a head-on aggressive stance.

The discovery of an impression of the skin covering the dorsal plates has implications for all possible functions of stegosaurian plates. Christiansen and Tschopp (2010) found that the skin was smooth with long, parallel, shallow grooves indicating a keratinous structure covering the plates. The addition of beta-keratin, a strong protein, would indeed allow the plates to bear more weight, suggesting they may have been used for active defense. A keratinous covering would also allow greater surface area for the plates to be uses as a mating display structures, which could be potentially coloured like the beaks of modern birds. At the same time this finding implies that the use of plates for thermo-regulation may be less likely because the keratinous covering would make heat transfer from the bone highly ineffective.

Classification
In 1877, Othniel Marsh discovered and named Stegosaurus armatus, from which the name of the family ‘Stegosauridae’ was erected in 1880. In comparison to basal stegosaurians, notable synapomorphies of Stegosauridae include a large antitrochanter (supracetabular process) in the ilium, a long prepubic process and long femur relative to the length of the humerus. Furthermore, stegosaurid sacral ribs are T-shaped in parasagittal cross-section and the dorsal vertebrae have an elongated neural arch.

Stegosaurid specimens originally described under the genera Wuerhosaurus and Hesperosaurus were referred to the genus Stegosaurus, under the names Stegosaurus homheni and Stegosaurus mjosi, respectively, by Maidment et al. (2010). Furthermore, many Stegosaurus specimens that were previously believed to from different species, within the genus, were all assigned to Stegosaurus armatus. This reclassification of the specimens occurred after finding that all differences between specimens could be explained by intraspecific variation.

The relationships within the stegosaurian family tree have been a matter of uncertainty. Both Mateus et al. (2009) and Maidment (2010) found similar phylogenetic relationships within Stegosauria. (shown below). Their phylogenies place the long-necked stegosaurid Miragaia as sister taxa to Dacentrurus forming the clade Dacentrurinae. Dacentrurus was previously considered to be an early-branching stegosaurid, but the discovery of Miragaia suggested that it was more derived then previously thought.

In 2017, Raven and Maidment published a new phylogenetic analysis, including almost every known stegosaurian genus:

Paleobiology

Posture 
A digital articulation and manipulation of digital scans of specimen material of Kentrosaurus inferred that stegosaurids may have used an erect limb posture, like that of most mammals, for habitual locomotion while using a sprawled crocodilian pose for defensive behavior. The sprawled pose would allow them to tolerate the large lateral forces used in swinging the spiked tail against predators as a clubbing device.

Feeding 
In order to explore the feeding habits of stegosaurids, Reichel (2010) created a 3-D model of Stegosaurus teeth using the software ZBrush. The model finds that the bite forces of Stegosaurus was significantly weaker than that of Labradors, wolves and humans. The finding suggests that these dinosaurs would be capable of breaking smaller branches and leaves with their teeth, but would not be able to bite through a thick object (12 mm or more in diameter). Parrish et al.’s (2004) description of Jurassic flora in the stegosaurid-rich Morrison Formation supports this finding. The flora during this time-period was dominated by seasonal small, fast-growing herbaceous plants, which stegosaurids could consume easily if Reichel's reconstruction is accurate.

Mallison (2010) suggested that Kentrosaurus may have used a tripodal stance on their hindlimbs and tail to double the foraging height from the general low browsing height under one metre for stegosaurids. This challenged the view that stegosaurs are primarily low vegetation feeders because of their small heads, short necks and short forelimbs, since the tripodal stance would also give them access to young trees and high bushes.

Another piece of evidence suggesting that some stegosaurids may have consumed more than just low vegetation was the discovery of the long-necked stegosaurid Miragaia longicollum. This dinosaur's neck has at least 17 cervical vertebrae achieved through the transformation of thoracic vertebrae into cervical vertebrae and possible lengthening of the centrum. This is more than most sauropod dinosaurs, which also achieved the elongation of the neck through similar mechanisms and had access to fodder higher off the ground.

Sexual dimorphism 

There have been several findings of possible sexual dimorphism in stegosaurids. Saitta (2015) presents evidence of two morphs of Hesperosaurus dorsal plates, with one morph having a wide, oval plate with a surface area 45% larger than the narrow, tall morph. Considering that dorsal plates most likely functioned as display structures and that the wide oval shape allowed a broad continuous display, Saitta assigns the wider morph with larger surface area as male.

Kevin Padian, a paleontologist at the University of California, Berkeley, remarked that Saitta had misidentified features in his specimen's bone tissue sections and said “there’s no evidence the animal has stopped growing”. Paidan also expressed ethical concerns about the use of private specimens in the study.

Kentrosaurus, Dacentrurus and Stegosaurus are also suggested to have exhibited dimorphism in the form of three extra sacral ribs in the females.

See also 
 Timeline of stegosaur research

References

Thyreophorans
Stegosaurs
Taxa named by Othniel Charles Marsh
Middle Jurassic first appearances
Early Cretaceous extinctions
Prehistoric dinosaur families